Kofoworola Bucknor-Akerele (born 30 April 1939) is a Nigerian politician and a former deputy governor of Lagos State.
She was the deputy governor to Bola Tinubu from 1999 to 2003.

Early life
Kofoworola Akerele was born on 30 April 1939, to Oni Akerele a prominent Nigerian activists and the first indigenous surgeon in Nigeria. She attended CMS Girls School Lagos before she travelled in 1949 to Surrey England for her Degree in Law.

Career

She got a diploma in Journalism in 1962, and worked as a freelance journalist for BBC and VON Magazine.
She became the deputy govermor of Lagos State when Bola Tinubu became governor on 29 May 1999.

References

1939 births
Living people
Women state deputy governors of Nigeria
Women in Lagos politics
Nigerian women journalists
20th-century Nigerian politicians
20th-century Nigerian women politicians
21st-century Nigerian politicians
21st-century Nigerian women politicians
Deputy Governors of Lagos State
St Anne's School, Ibadan alumni